Paraidemona fratercula is a species of spur-throated grasshopper in the family Acrididae. It is found in North America.

References

Melanoplinae
Articles created by Qbugbot
Insects described in 1918